The Death of the White Stallion is a 1985 West German drama film directed by Christian Ziewer. It was entered into the 35th Berlin International Film Festival.

Cast
 Thomas Anzenhofer as Veit
 Péter Franke as Kilian Feuerbacher
 Udo Samel as Father Andreas
 Angela Schanelec as Anna
 Dietmar Schönherr as Caspar von Schenkenstein
 Jürgen von Alten
 Ulrich Wildgruber as Abbot Georg

References

External links

1985 films
West German films
1980s German-language films
German historical films
1980s historical films
Films set in the 16th century
Films set in the Holy Roman Empire
1980s German films